Al Sadd Futsal Team is part of the Al Sadd Sports Club in Qatar. It is a futsal team based in Doha, Qatar and it plays its home matches in the Jassim bin Hamad Indoor Hall. Al Sadd have been the most successful team in the Qatar professional futsal league since its inauguration in 2006/2007, winning it a total of four times.

Al Sadd participated in the 2010 AFC Futsal Club Championship. They topped their group and advanced to the semi-finals where they beat Nagoya Oceans by a margin of 7–4. They subsequently lost 5–2 to Foolad Mahan in Tehran in the final. No other Qatari club has ever reached the finals of the AFC Futsal Club Championship since its inauguration in 2010.

The team was inaugurated in the Guinness Book of World Records in March 2014 for winning 34 matches in a row from January 2012 to March 2013, the most consecutive matches any futsal team has ever won.

Season to season
As of December 31, 2013.

First team current squad 2012/13
As of December 31, 2013.

Current technical staff
As of December 31, 2013.
 Team manager:  Ali Khalifa Al-Dosari
 Administrator:  Abdullah Al-Balushi
 Head coach:  Mohammad Eisa Al-Qubaisi
 Assistant coach:  Mohammed Attiyah
 Goalkeeping coach:  Mohsen Karim Dad
 Physiotherapist:  Stefcho Petan

Managerial history
  Redouane Lhbibani (2007–08)
  Fabiano Ribeiro (2009–10)
  Mohammad Eisa Al-Qubaisi (2011–present)

Club honours
 4 Qatar League: (2007–2008), (2008–2009), (2011–2012), (2012–2013)
 1 Qatar Association Cup: (2009–2010)

References

External links
 Official website

Al Sadd SC
Futsal clubs in Qatar